The Sanskrit term, Bhānumati (Sanskrit:भानुमती), meaning – "luminous" or "shining like the Sun", is derived from the word,  Bhānu  (Sanskrit:भानु). In the Rig Vedic parlance, Bhanu is an epithet of the Maruts and means - "variegated colour", "shining with light" or "shining like a serpent" or "causing the motion of the wind". For a very long time in India, Bhānumati was a much preferred name for girls. Bhānumati was the name of a daughter of Angiras. The daughter of Raja Bhoj of Dhara Nagari was named Bhānumati who too like her father was a magician.

Duryodhana’s wife's name was also Bhānumati; she is an important figure in the Sanskrit Drama of Bhatta Narayana – Venisamhara (Braiding the hair). In very ancient times, there was the ever victorious king named Dharmamūrti who had destroyed hundreds of enemies and thousands of Daityas, and who though a mortal had access to each and every region of the universe. He was a friend of Indra, and his lustre eclipsed even the Sun and the Moon. His wife's name was Bhānumati, who was in those days the most beautiful woman in the three regions; matchless like the Goddess Lakshmi, she was dearer than life to the king (Matsya Purana XCII.19-20). Legend has it that a granddaughter of Krishna was also named Bhānumati.

Bhānumati is the name of Chakrapani Datta's commentary on Suśrutha Samhitā. In the Muthuswami Dikshitar school of music, Vanaspati raga, the 4th melakarta in the seventy-two janaka ragas of Carnatic music, is called Bhānumati.

References

Vedas
Sanskrit words and phrases